In medicine, synechia  can refer to:
Synechia (eye)
Asherman's syndrome (uterine synechia)
Nasal synechiae
Penile synechiae (adhesion of the foreskin to the glans)

de:Synechie
hr:Sinehija